Ed J. Carpenter (2 May 1900 – 11 May 1965) was an American politician from Texas.

Carpenter was born in the community of Vincent, Texas, on 2 May 1900. He later moved to Coahoma and became a rancher. Carpenter served as a judge on the Howard County Court for eight years, before winning a state legislative election in 1962 as a Democratic member of the Texas House of Representatives from District 78. He died in office on 11 May 1965, necessitating a special election won by Roger D. Brown.

References

20th-century American politicians
1900 births
1965 deaths
People from Howard County, Texas
20th-century American judges
County judges in Texas
Ranchers from Texas
Democratic Party members of the Texas House of Representatives